Daniele Delli Carri (born 18 September 1971) is a retired Italian footballer who played as a defender.

Personal life
His son Filippo Delli Carri is now a professional footballer.

Honours

Club
Genoa
 Anglo-Italian Cup winner: 1995–96

Torino
 Serie B champion: 2000–01

International
Italy U21
 UEFA European Under-21 Championship winner: 1994

References

External links
 Profile at FootballDatabase.eu
 
 Profile at FIGC.it 

Living people
1971 births
Italian footballers
Italy under-21 international footballers
Serie A players
Serie B players
Serie C players
Torino F.C. players
S.S.D. Lucchese 1905 players
Genoa C.F.C. players
Piacenza Calcio 1919 players
A.C.N. Siena 1904 players
ACF Fiorentina players
Delfino Pescara 1936 players
Calcio Foggia 1920 players
Place of birth missing (living people)
Association football defenders
A.S. Bisceglie Calcio 1913 players